Boysgroup, stylized as BOYSGROUP, is a Japanese alternative idol boy band formed by WACK in 2022. They debuted with the studio album, We are Boysgroup, on January 18, 2023.

History
In 2021, WACK held the Project WACK-Chin Audition. The winner of the audition, Tasukukusu, would go on to take part in WACK's first all-male audition, the WACK Men's Joint Audition, in February 2022. During the audition camp it was announced that WACK intented to debut its first boy group. By the end of the audition camp Tasukukusu had been eliminated and three finalists: John Gokuh, Chin Bonbon, and Che Jiming, later known as Rin, Ryosei, and Shunji, respectively, were announced as members of the upcoming group. The group went by the tentative name, WACK Boyz. The Second WACK Men's Joint Audition was held in August 2022. At the end of the audition camp four of the participants: Ecchichichiichiichii, New, Yatto The Endo, and Hanagemonster, later known as Hinata, Haru, Ayuru, and Ryota, respectively, were chosen to also join the group. Hinata withdrew from the group in October 2022. On December 7, the group was given the name Boysgroup.

They released their debut album, We are Boysgroup, on January 18, 2023. Their first single will be released on May 10.

Members

Discography

Studio albums

References

Japanese boy bands
Japanese idol groups
Japanese pop music groups
Musical groups established in 2022
2022 establishments in Japan